North Fork Pass may refer to:

Mountain passes
North Fork Pass (Alberta), a pass in Banff National Park, Alberta, Canada
North Fork Pass (Alberta-British Columbia), a pass on the Continental Divide of the Americas between Alberta and British Columbia, Canada
North Fork Pass (Yukon), a pass in Yukon, Canada

See also 
NFP (disambiguation)